The 5th Arkansas Field Battery (1862–1865) was a Confederate Army artillery battery during the American Civil War. The unit was originally referred to as the 'Appeal Artillery or the Memphis Appeal Battery.
Battlefield markers at the National Vicksburg Military Park describe the unit as Appeal (Arkansas) Battery. The unit served east of the Mississippi River until it surrendered at the end of the Vicksburg Campaign. After being exchanged, the battery re-organized and served the remainder of the war in the Department of the Trans-Mississippi.

Organization
The Appeal Artillery was organized at Memphis, Tennessee, on March 7, 1862, under the command of Captain William C. Bryan. Many of the original members came from Ouachita County, Arkansas, but apparently ten members, half the employees, of the staff of the Appeal newspaper (the Commercial Appeal today), joined the battery.  The unit was outfitted by the proprietors of the Memphis Appeal, who had strong connections to Camden in Ouachita County. It is unclear if this outfitting of the battery included the guns themselves. General M. Jeff. Thompson's order-book indicates that the battery's first guns were obtained from a disbanded Missouri State Guard unit. Other sources indicated that the unit was issued four cannons in Memphis: two  Iron Ordnance rifles and two  bronze field howitzers. These may have come from the Quinby & Robinson Company of Memphis, Tennessee.

On May 6, Captain Bryan and his Appeal Battery were ready. That night, amid tremendous enthusiasm of Memphis citizens, the battery departed from the old Memphis & Charleston Railway depot for Corinth, Mississippi, where the Confederate Army was re-organizing following its defeat at Shiloh the month before. A silken flag was presented to the departing battery by a hoop-skirted young woman whom The Appeals reporter described as, "the lady of Dr. Keller." She made the presentation speech in the flowery language of her time.

Captain Bryan accepted the silken flag. His speech of acceptance has been lost to history, but The Memphis Appeals reporter assures readers that "he responded in spirited and appropriate terms, and his men received the flag with three hearty cheers for the amiable donor." Several of the men, so the story added, "made earnest appeals to Captain Bryan that to them might be committed the honor of carrying the flag in the fight."

The battery officers included: Captain W. C. Bryan; Lieutenant (later Captain) William N. Hogg; Lieutenant (later Captain) Christopher C. Scott; Second Lieutenant Robert S. Walker. Under Captain Hogg's command: Lieutenant Christopher C. Scott; Second Lieutenant Robert S. Walker; Second Lieutenant R. N. Cotton. Under Captain Scott's command: Lieutenant R. N. Cotton; Lieutenant E. W. Lightfoot.

Service
The battery was initially assigned to the support of Rust's (later Dockery's and Cabell's) brigade in Maury's division of the Army of the West, camped at that time around Corinth, Mississippi.

The battery supported Colonel William L. Cabell's brigade of Brigadier General Dabney H. Muary's Division of Major General Sterling Price's Corps of Major General Earl Van Dorn's Army of the West throughout the Corinth campaign in the summer of 1862. The unit fought at the battle of Corinth on October 3–4, 1862. The unit sustained three killed and three wounded in the conflicts at Corinth and the Battle of Hatchie's Bridge. Lieutenant Hog, who commanded the Appeal Battery during the Battle of Hatchie's Bridge, and his men were specifically cited by Brigadier General Cabel for "especial notice for the skill and efficiency with which they handled the battery and pours shell and grape into the enemy's ranks".

In November 1862, the battery was reassigned to support Hébert's brigade in Forney's division in Department of Mississippi and East Louisiana, where it served during the Vicksburg campaign in the early summer of 1863, and was assigned to the Vicksburg defenses during the 47-day siege of that city in May–July, 1863. The unit apparently had a hard time keeping control of its own guns during the siege of Vicksburg:

A detachment of the battery, under Lieutenant Christopher C. Scott, served one 3-inch rifle in the position known as the Third Louisiana Redan, from May 18, 1863, until the surrender, July 4, 1863. The battery's casualties during the siege included four killed five wounded. On May 19, 1863, Captain Hogg was severely wounded, and Lieutenant Walker was killed. A corporal and four privates were also killed or wounded in that incident. Captain Hogg died of his wounds on May 28, 1863. Christopher C. Scott wounded on duty in the Third Louisiana Redan June 25, 1863.

The battery was surrendered with the Vicksburg garrison on July 4, 1863. General Ulysses S. Grant initially demanded the conditional surrender of the Vicksburg garrison, but faced with the necessity of feeding 30,000 starving Confederates and having the idea that these soldiers might do more harm to the Confederate cause by being released to return home rather than being exchanged as whole units, he relented and allowed for the immediate parole of the unit. According to the Confederate War Department, the Union leader encouraged the surrendered Confederates to simply return home, rather than being officially paroled and exchanged. The able bodied Confederate soldiers who were released on parole walked out of Vicksburg (they were not allowed to proceed in any military formations) on July 11, 1863. Paroling of these able bodied men was completed in their respective camps inside Vicksburg prior to July 11. Those who were wounded or sick in the various hospitals in Vicksburg were paroled, and were released, as soon as they could leave on their own. July 15/16 is the most common date of these Vicksburg hospital paroles. Some of the most seriously wounded and sick were sent by steamship down the Mississippi River and over to Mobile, Alabama, where they were delivered on parole to Confederate authorities.

Confederate commanders designated Enterprise, Mississippi, as the rendezvous point (parole camp) for the Vicksburg parolees to report to after they got clear of the last Federal control point at Big Black Bridge. Most of the Arkansas units, including many survivors of the Appeal Battery, appear to have bypassed the established parole camps, and possibly with the support, or at least by the compliancy, of their Union captors, simply crossed the river and returned home. Because so many of the Vicksburg parolees, especially from Arkansas, simply went home, Major General Pemberton requested Confederate President Davis grant the men a thirty to sixty-day furlough.  The furloughs were not strictly adhered to so long as the soldier eventually showed up at a parole camp to be declared exchanged and returned to duty. Those who went directly home were treated as if they had been home on furlough if they eventually reported into one of these two parole centers. The exchange declaration reports issued by Colonel Robert Ould in Richmond for various units in the Vicksburg and Port Hudson surrenders began in September 1863 based upon men who actually reported to one of the two parole camps. Pemberton eventually coordinated with the Confederate War Department and Confederate General Kirby Smith, commanding the Department of the Trans-Mississippi, to have the Arkansas Vicksburg parolee's rendezvous point established at Camden, Arkansas.

Apparently Captain Scott and eight members of the battery did report to the exchange camp, but since most of the battery members had crossed the Mississippi River and returned to Arkansas, they were left without a unit.

Captain Scott was apparently successful in being transferred back across the river. The battery was declared to be exchanged as of December 20, 1863. The battery was reorganized and re-equipped by the survivors who returned to Arkansas, with four guns and Captain Christopher C. Scott assumed command. In early April, 1864, when word came of Union Major General Frederick Steele's advance toward Camden, Arkansas, as part of the Arkansas phase of the Red River Campaign, the battery was stationed at Lewisville, Arkansas, without guns.  The unit had apparently been armed but had given up its guns and was awaiting arrival of replacements.  While some member of the unit attached themselves to other commander during the campaign, the battery apparently played no organized roll in the Camden Expedition.

The remnants of the battery stranded on the east side of the Mississippi River were apparently still seeking to be reassigned to a unit a year later when this letter was written:

In the late summer of 1864, the battery was re-equipped with two 12-pounder howitzers and two 6-pounder smoothbores. The battery was designated as the Fifth Arkansas Field Battery on November 19, 1864. On December 31, 1864, General Edmund Kirby Smith listed the battery as belonging to Blocher's Artillery Battalion of Acting Major General Churchill's First Infantry Division of Major General John B. Magruder's Second Army Corps, Army of the Trans-Mississippi.

The battery participated in the following engagements:

Second Battle of Corinth, Mississippi October 3–4, 1862.
Battle of Hatchie's Bridge, Mississippi, 1863
Siege of Vicksburg, May 18 to July 4, 1863.

Surrender
When news of the surrender, first of General Robert E. Lee's army and two weeks late the surrender of General Joseph E. Johnston's army reached the Army of the Trans-Mississippi, the Appeal Battery, now known as the 5th Arkansas Field Battery, was encamped around Marshall, Texas, where the Army had been moved due to a general lack of forage in Arkansas.  The battery which, along with four others belonged to an artillery battalion under the command of Major McMahan from Galveston, Texas, was camped on the south side of the town, with the infantry units camped on the north side of town.  Upon news of the surrender, the units simply disbanded and returned home rather than await a formal surrender.  This led to the battalion's guns being abandoned outside of town and the battery equipment being looted by local civilians and all of the government horses being taken by former soldiers.    
The battery was formally surrendered with General Kirby Smith's army on May 26, 1865. The date of the military convention between Confederate General Kirby Smith and Union General Edward Canby for the surrender of the troops and public property in the Trans-Mississippi Department was May 26, 1865, however, it took a while for parole commissioners to be appointed and for public property to be accounted for. As a result, a final report of field artillery which was part of the accounting process, was not completed until June 1, 1865. According to the final accounting, at the time of the surrender, the battery was armed with two 12-pounder field howitzers and two 6-pounder guns. In the final report, the Captain C.C. Scott is listed as the commander and the unit was located at Marshall, Texas.

See also

List of Arkansas Civil War Confederate units
Lists of American Civil War Regiments by State
Confederate Units by State
Arkansas in the American Civil War
Arkansas Militia in the Civil War

Notes

References

 William F. Avera Memoirs, Manuscript Collection 1685, Special Collections Department, University of Arkansas Libraries
 Elliott, M. A., & United Daughters of the Confederacy. (1911). The garden of memory: Stories of the Civil War as told by veterans and daughters of the Confederacy. Camden, Ark: Brown Print. Co. 
 Memphis daily appeal. (1847). Memphis, Tenn: S.T. Seawell & W.N. Stanton. 
 Sikakis, Stewart, Compendium of the Confederate Armies, Florida and Arkansas, Facts on File, Inc., 1992, 
 United States. (1961). Compiled service records of Confederate soldiers who served in organizations from the State of Arkansas. Washington, D.C.: National Archives, National Archives and Records Service, General Services Administration. 
 U.S. War Department, The War of the Rebellion: a Compilation of the Official Records of the Union and Confederate Armies, U.S. Government Printing Office, 1880–1901.

External links
Edward G. Gerdes Civil War Home Page
The Encyclopedia of Arkansas History and Culture
The War of the Rebellion: a Compilation of the Official Records of the Union and Confederate Armies
The Arkansas History Commission, State Archives, Civil War in Arkansas

Units and formations of the Confederate States Army from Arkansas
1865 disestablishments in Arkansas
Military units and formations disestablished in 1865
Military units and formations in Arkansas
1862 establishments in Arkansas
Military units and formations established in 1862
Artillery units and formations of the American Civil War